Jakičevo is a small settlement northwest of Velike Lašče in central Slovenia. The area is part of the traditional region of Lower Carniola and is now included in the Central Slovenia Statistical Region.

There is a small wayside shrine dedicated to the Virgin Mary east of the village. It dates to the last quarter of the 18th century.

References

External links
Jakičevo on Geopedia

Populated places in the Municipality of Velike Lašče